Bohdan Blavatskyi (born 7 June 1963) is a Soviet Ukrainian former football forward and now a football coach since 1994.

Coaching career
Bohdan Blavatskyi started his coaching career in 1994 taking charge of FC Harai Zhovkva. In 1995, he won the Ukrainian Amateur League with this club. In 1998, Bohdan became the head coach of Ukrainian Premier League club, Prykarpattya Ivano-Frankivsk.

In 1999–2000, he was coach of Podillya Khmelnytskyi. In 2000–2003, he was in charge of FC Krasyliv, which finished first in the Ukrainian Second League under his leadership and were promoted to the Ukrainian First League. In 2003–04, he was coach of Spartak Ivano-Frankivsk. In 2004–05, he was the coach of Metalurh-2 Zaporizhzhia, and in 2005-06 he was the coach of Obolon Kyiv.

He was the coach of FC Podillya-Khmelnytskyi in its debuting season of 2007–08. After it finished 3rd, Bohdan left to PFC Nyva Vinnytsia where he is currently the head coach.

External links 
Info on Nyva website (in list) 

1963 births
Living people
Soviet footballers
Ukrainian footballers
Ukrainian football managers
FC Sokil Lviv players
NK Veres Rivne players
FC Haray Zhovkva managers
FC Krasyliv managers
FC Spartak Ivano-Frankivsk managers
FC Podillya Khmelnytskyi managers
FC Metalurh-2 Zaporizhzhia managers
FC Obolon Kyiv managers
FC Nyva Vinnytsia managers
Ukrainian Premier League managers
Motor Lublin managers
FC Enerhetyk Burshtyn managers
Stal Rzeszów managers
Ukrainian expatriate football managers
Expatriate football managers in Poland
Ukrainian expatriate sportspeople in Poland
FC Lviv managers
FC Uzhhorod managers
Association football forwards
Sportspeople from Lviv Oblast